Cucharas Pass is a  elevation mountain pass in the Sangre de Cristo Mountains in south central Colorado in the United States.

At the top, the pass is signed as Cuchara Pass and the elevation on the sign there reads 9995 ft. State Highway 12 traverses the pass. Highway 12 is also signed as the Highway of Legends Scenic Byway, one of Colorado's Scenic and Historic Byways.

The region gets its name from the spoon-like shape of the valley, with "cuchara" being the Spanish word for "spoon."

References

Mountain passes of Colorado
Landforms of Las Animas County, Colorado
Landforms of Huerfano County, Colorado
Transportation in Huerfano County, Colorado
Transportation in Las Animas County, Colorado